John Bristow (13 April 1840 – 25 January 1912) was an English cricketer. He played 32 first-class matches for Surrey between 1867 and 1873.

See also
 List of Surrey County Cricket Club players

References

External links
 

1840 births
1912 deaths
Cricketers from Esher
English cricketers
People from Esher
Surrey cricketers